Darijo Grujcic (born 19 May 1999) is an Austrian professional footballer who plays as a midfielder for Austria Lustenau.

Career
Grujcic is a youth product of Austria Lustenau and AKA Vorarlberg. He began his senior career with Dornbirn in the Austrian Regionalliga in 2017. On 30 November 2017, he signed a pre-contract with his childhood club Austria Lustenau that ran from January 2018 to June 2020. When his contract expired, he moved to Wacker Innsbruck in the summer of 2020. Wacker Innsbruck ran into financial issues in the summer of 2022, and on 27 April 2022 Grujcic was free to leave the club on a free transfer. On 31 May 2022, he once again transferred to Austria Lustenau as they were newly promoted to the Austrian Football Bundesliga for the 2022-23 season.

Personal life
Grujcic's father, Darko Grujcic, is a retired former footballer.

References

External links
 
 OEFB Profile

1999 births
Living people
People from Lustenau
Austrian footballers
Austrian people of Croatian descent
FC Dornbirn 1913 players
SK Austria Klagenfurt players
FC Wacker Innsbruck (2002) players
Austrian Football Bundesliga players
2. Liga (Austria) players
Austrian Regionalliga players
Footballers from Vorarlberg